The Jahazpur Fort is a Mewar fort in the city of Jahazpur, Rajasthan, India.

References 

Forts in Rajasthan
Bhilwara district